Prototheca is a genus of algae in the family Chlorellaceae. All the species within this genus, even though classified as green algae, have forfeited their photosynthetic ability and have switched to parasitism. Some species can cause the disease protothecosis, otherwise known as Algaemia.

Symptoms include: Cutaneous lesions, Olecranon bursitis.

Etymology
From the Greek proto- (first) + thēkē (sheath), Prototheca is a genus of variably shaped spherical cells of achloric algae in the family Chlorellaceae. Wilhelm Krüger, a German expert in plant physiology and sugar production, reported Prototheca microorganisms in 1894, shortly after spending 7 years in Java studying sugarcane. He isolated Prototheca species from the sap of 3 tree species. Krüger named these organisms as P. moriformis and P. zopfii, the second name as a tribute to Friedrich Wilhelm Zopf, a renowned botanist, mycologist, and lichenologist.

References

External links

Trebouxiophyceae genera
Chlorellaceae